Dickinson County is a county located in the U.S. state of Iowa. As of the 2020 census, the population was 17,703. The county seat is Spirit Lake. The county was organized in 1857 and is named in honor of Daniel S. Dickinson, a U.S. Senator for New York.

Dickinson County comprises the Spirit Lake, IA Micropolitan Statistical Area.

Geography
It is the smallest county by land area in Iowa, and the fifth-smallest by total area.

A region known as the Iowa Great Lakes is in Dickinson County, making it a popular vacation destination for Iowans, and explaining the recent high population growth in the area.  The lakes include West Okoboji Lake, East Okoboji Lake, and Spirit Lake.

Major highways
 U.S. Highway 71
 Iowa Highway 9
 Iowa Highway 86

Adjacent counties
Jackson County, Minnesota  (north)
Emmet County  (east)
Clay County  (south)
Osceola County  (west)

Demographics

2020 census

There were 13,691 housing units of which 7,976 were occupied.

2010 census
There were 12,849 housing units, of which 7,554 were occupied.

2000 census

As of the census of 2000, there were 16,424 people, 7,103 households, and 4,759 families residing in the county. There were 11,375 housing units at an average density of 30 per square mile (12/km2). The racial makeup of the county was 98.90% White, 0.18% Black or African American, 0.21% Native American, 0.18% Asian, 0.01% Pacific Islander, 0.10% from other races, and 0.43% from two or more races.  0.66% of the population were Hispanic or Latino of any race.

There were 7,103 households, out of which 26.10% had children under the age of 18 living with them, 57.80% were married couples living together, 6.70% had a female householder with no husband present, and 33.00% were non-families. 28.60% of all households were made up of individuals, and 13.70% had someone living alone who was 65 years of age or older.  The average household size was 2.27 and the average family size was 2.78.

In the county, the population was spread out, with 21.90% under the age of 18, 6.60% from 18 to 24, 23.90% from 25 to 44, 26.90% from 45 to 64, and 20.60% who were 65 years of age or older.  The median age was 43 years. For every 100 females, there were 95.00 males.  For every 100 females age 18 and over, there were 92.30 males.

The median income for a household in the county was $39,020, and the median income for a family was $47,739. Males had a median income of $30,523 versus $22,131 for females. The per capita income for the county was $21,929.  6.00% of the population and 4.20% of families were below the poverty line.  Out of the total people living in poverty 5.90% of those under the age of 18 and 7.00% of those 65 and older were living below the poverty line.

Communities

Cities

Arnolds Park
Lake Park
Milford
Okoboji
Orleans
Spirit Lake
Superior
Terril
Wahpeton
West Okoboji

Unincorporated community
Montgomery

Townships
Dickinson County is divided into twelve townships:

 Center Grove
 Diamond Lake
 Excelsior
 Lakeville
 Lloyd
 Milford
 Okoboji
 Richland
 Silver Lake
 Spirit Lake
 Superior
 Westport

Population ranking

The population ranking of the following table is based on the 2020 census of Dickinson County.
† county seat

Politics

See also

 National Register of Historic Places listings in Dickinson County, Iowa

References

Further reading
 R.A. Smith, A History of Dickinson County, Iowa: Together with an Account of The Spirit Lake Massacre, and the Indian Troubles on the Northwestern Frontier. Des Moines, IA: The Kenyon Printing & Mfg. Co., 1902.
 History of Emmet County and Dickinson County, Iowa: A Record of Settlement, Organization, Progress and Achievement. In Two Volumes. Chicago: Pioneer Publishing Co., 1917.
 Volume 1 | Volume 2

External links

Dickinson County government's website 
http://www.iowadot.gov/maps//msp/pdf/Dickinson.pdf

 
1857 establishments in Iowa
Populated places established in 1857
Micropolitan areas of Iowa